Chulaimbo is a town in Western Kenya, 35 km West of Kisumu City, located along the busy Kisumu -Busia  road.

Health Centre 
Chulaimbo serves as a health center, being the home of Chulaimbo County Hospital and Masaba Hospital.

Educational Centre 
Schools such as Chulaimbo Boys High School and Chulaimbo Primary School are located within the Town

Residential Centre

Chulaimbo is a residential area for many people, many of whom who works in the facilities located in the  town, such as the Schools, hospitals and the business enterprises

Economic Centre

Chulaimbo is a home to many businesses enterprises, ranging from wholesale services to retail services. Traders here trade in a range of goods, ranging from agricultural products to Commercial products  

Populated places in Kenya